Apocalipse is a Brazilian telenovela produced by Casablanca for RecordTV. Created by Vivian de Oliveira. Written with Alexandre Teixeira, Maria Claudia Oliveira. It premiered on November 21, 2017 and ended on June 25, 2018. It stars Igor Rickli, Sérgio Marone, 
Juliana Knust, Fernando Pavão, and Flávio Galvão, with special participation of Carolina Oliveira. It is based on the biblical story Book of Revelation. It is the fourth biblical telenovela by Record TV.

Plot 
The story begins in the late 1980s, and in the first phase of the novel, the relationship between four young people who, for one reason or another, chose New York as a university destination is emphasized. Alan (American), Susana (Brazilian), Adriano (Italian) and Débora (Israeli) become inseparable, exploring fascinating Manhattan intensely. Alan and Susana live a delicate relationship that evolves into a beautiful love story; Adriano and Debora are more intense and passionate and, surrounded by a mysterious and somber force, marry in a troubled way and live an unhappy relationship. Other everyday and parallel characters appear in this first phase and will be introduced during the course of the novel.

The second phase begins in 2001, with the return of the failing and doubtful couple, Adriano and Débora and son Ricardo to the Big Apple, where they resume contact with the old couple of friends Alan, Susana and their son, Benjamin. Débora, however, is envious of Susana, since her relationship with Adriano is faceless. Several apocalyptic prophecies promise to take place in various cities around the world, in Rio de Janeiro, Rome, Jerusalem, and New York, where the fateful September 11 is part of the narrative.

The third phase brings the story to the present day and shows how the characters are impacted by the biblical promises. There will be moments of faith, hope, pain, sadness and anguish, where the audience will see the best and the worst of the human being. Ricardo will be the antagonist, the antichrist who will fight to dominate the world; he will empower himself with scientific discoveries of Benjamin, who has become a great scientist and has married Zoe, and will use it to commit atrocities. People of the past who have committed terrible acts may surprise the public by accepting Christ, while "lukewarm" Christians may not resist and prefer to worship the devil to be spared from death.

Cast 
 Juliana Knust as Zoe Santero
 Igor Rickli as Benjamin Gudman
 Sérgio Marone as Ricardo Montana 'The Antichrist'
 Paloma Bernardi as Isabela Gudman
 Fernando Pavão as César Sardes
 Juliana Silveira as Raquel Santero Sardes
 Bia Seidl as Débora Koheg
 Selma Egrei as Verônica Montana
 Eduardo Lago as Adriano Montana
 Eduardo Galvão as Alan Gudman
 Mônica Torres as Susana Aisen Gudman
 Flávio Galvão as Stefano Nicolazzi
 Thaís Melchior as Melina 
 Sidney Sampaio as André Santero
 Leona Cavalli as Ariela Feld Gudman
 Emílio Orciollo Netto as Uri Gudman
 Joana Fomm as Teresa Santero
 Luíza Tomé as Letícia Santero
 Marcos Winter as Oswaldo Santero
 Rafael Sardão as Tiago Santero
 Flávia Monteiro as Sabrina Santero
 Jandir Ferrari as Felipe Santero
 Lucinha Lins as Lía Aisen
 Lisandra Souto as Estela Aisen Peixoto
 Norival Rizo as Rúben Aisen
 Cláudio Gabriel as Saulo Gudman
 Castrinho as Oziel Gudman
 Beth Zalcman as Marta Gudman
 Jussara Freire as Tamar Koheg
 Henri Pagnocelli as Gideon Koheg
 Adriana Prado as Hanna Koheg
 Raphael Sander as Noah Koheg
 Samara Felippo as Natália Menezes
 Daniela Escobar as Ângela Menezes
 Igor Cosso as Dudu Poeira
 Sandro Rocha as Henrique Peixoto
 Marcelo Valle as Dylan
 Jayme Periard as Nicanor
 Thaís Pacholek as Monique Filadélfia
 Carla Marins as Tiatira Abdul
 Nina de Pádua as Glória Solani
 Thaíssa Carvalho as Celeste Beyoncé
 Andrey Lopes as Chico Gouveia
 Roberto Birindelli as Guido Fontes
 Paulo Vilela as Wallace
 ZéCarlos Machado as Ezequiel
 Adriana Londoño as Esmirna
 Renato Livera as Zé Bento
 Adriano Garib as Tião de Deus
 Bruno Daltro as Robinson
 Augusto Zacchi as Lúcio
 Junno Andrade as Arthur Pestana
 Aline Borges as Bárbara Queiroz
 Fredy Costa as Diogo
 Pérola Faria as Brenda
 Bruno Guedes as Bruno Aisen Peixoto
 Lais Pinho as Talita Aisen Peixoto
 Ronny Kriwat as Augusto Santero Sardes
 João Bourbonnais as Lorenzo Viscone
 Jonatas Faro as Vittorio
 Nathália Costa as Ester Gudman
 Isabela Koppel as Lorena Santero Sardes

Special participation 
 Carolina Oliveira as Susana (young)
 Manuela do Monte as Débora (young)
 Felipe Cunha as Adriano (young)
 Maurício Pitanga as Alan (young)
 Brendha Haddad as Hanna (young)
 Laura Kuczynski as Sabrina (young)
 Gabriel Reif as Oswaldo (young)
 Juliana Xavier as Leticia (young)
 Miguel Roncato as Felipe (young)
 Antonella Matos as Isabela (young)
 Fhelipe Gomes as Uri (young)
 Rafaela Sampaio as Estela (young)
 Guilherme Hamaceck as Saulo (young)
 Laryssa Ayres as Ariela (young)
 Yana Sardenberg as Tiatira (young)
 Gabriela Saraivah as Zoe Santero (1st phase)
 Pedrinho Mello as Benjamin Gudman (1st phase)
 Luiz Eduardo Toledo as Ricardo Montana (1st phase)
 Kadu Schons as André (1st phase)
 César Borges as César (1st phase)
 Marcelo Argenta as Luís Sardes (1st phase)
 Maytê Piragibe as Ana Sardes (1st and 2nd phase)
 Cleiton Morais as Guido Fontes (1st phase)
 Cacau Melo as Sandra
 Gilberto Hernandez as Jonathan Gudman
 Deborah Kalume as Elisa Gudman

Production 
Production for the telenovela began in July 2017. Sergio Marone and Guilherme Winter were the first cast members confirmed. Winter later left to star in another Record TV production and was replaced by Igor Rickli. Filming began in August 2017 and promotional videos began airing on November 10, 2017. A press conference for the telenovela was held on November 16, 2017. Between 150 and 170 episodes were confirmed.

Ratings

References

External links 
 

2017 telenovelas
Brazilian telenovelas
RecordTV telenovelas
Television series based on the Bible
2017 Brazilian television series debuts
2018 Brazilian television series endings
Fictional depictions of the Antichrist
Television shows set in Rio de Janeiro (city)
Portuguese-language telenovelas
Apocalyptic television series